In mathematics, in set theory, the constructible universe (or Gödel's constructible universe), denoted by , is a particular class of sets that can be described entirely in terms of simpler sets.  is the union of the constructible hierarchy . It was introduced by Kurt Gödel in his 1938 paper "The Consistency of the Axiom of Choice and of the Generalized Continuum-Hypothesis". In this paper, he proved that the constructible universe is an inner model of ZF set theory (that is, of Zermelo–Fraenkel set theory with the axiom of choice excluded), and also that the axiom of choice and the generalized continuum hypothesis are true in the constructible universe. This shows that both propositions are consistent with the basic axioms of set theory, if ZF itself is consistent. Since many other theorems only hold in systems in which one or both of the propositions is true, their consistency is an important result.

What  is

 can be thought of as being built in "stages" resembling the construction of von Neumann universe, . The stages are indexed by ordinals. In von Neumann's universe, at a successor stage, one takes  to be the set of all subsets of the previous stage, . By contrast, in Gödel's constructible universe , one uses only those subsets of the previous stage that are:

definable by a formula in the formal language of set theory,
with parameters from the previous stage and,
with the quantifiers interpreted to range over the previous stage.

By limiting oneself to sets defined only in terms of what has already been constructed, one ensures that the resulting sets will be constructed in a way that is independent of the peculiarities of the surrounding model of set theory and contained in any such model.

Define the Def operator:

L is defined by transfinite recursion as follows:
 
  
 If  is a limit ordinal, then  Here  means  precedes .
  Here Ord denotes the class of all ordinals.

then . Consequently, this is a tower of nested transitive sets. But  itself is a proper class.

Additional facts about the sets 

Equality beyond this point does not hold. On the other hand,  =  does imply that  equals  if  = , for example if  is inaccessible. More generally,  =  implies  =  for all infinite cardinals .

So these sets are equinumerous in any model of set theory that includes them.

As defined above, Def() is the set of subsets of  defined by Δ formulas (with respect to the Levy hierarchy, i.e., formulas of set theory containing only bounded quantifiers) that use as parameters only  and its elements.

This definition makes no reference to definability.

is a standard inner model of ZFC 
 is a standard model, i.e.
 (∈) is a substructure of (∈), which is well founded, so  is well founded.
 Axiom of extensionality: Two sets are the same if they have the same elements.
 Axiom of empty set: {} is a set.
So .
 Axiom of pairing: If ,  are sets, then  is a set.
Then {,} = { |  ∈  and ( =  or  = )} ∈ .
Thus .
 Transfinite induction can be used to show each ordinal  ∈ . In particular,  ∈  and thus  ∈ .
 Axiom of separation: Given any set  and any proposition (...,), { |  ∈  and (...,)} is a set.
So { |  ∈  and (...,) holds in } = { |  ∈  and  ∈  and (...,) holds in } ∈ .
 Axiom of replacement: Given any set  and any mapping (formally defined as a proposition where and P() implies  = ), { | there exists  ∈  such that} is a set.

L is absolute and minimal 

Indeed,  is the intersection of all such classes.

This set is called the minimal model of ZFC. Using the downward Löwenheim–Skolem theorem, one can show that the minimal model (if it exists) is a countable set.

Of course, any consistent theory must have a model, so even within the minimal model of set theory there are sets that are models of ZF (assuming ZF is consistent). However, those set models are non-standard. In particular, they do not use the normal element relation and they are not well founded.

However,  does not hold in any other standard model of ZF.

L and large cardinals 
Weakly inaccessible cardinals become strongly inaccessible. Weakly Mahlo cardinals become strongly Mahlo.

So all the large cardinals whose existence implies 0 cease to have those large cardinal properties, but retain the properties weaker than 0 which they also possess.

Furthermore, any strictly increasing class function from the class of indiscernibles to itself can be extended in a unique way to an elementary embedding of  into . This gives  a nice structure of repeating segments.

can be well-ordered 
There are various ways of well-ordering . Instead of explaining the fine structure, we will give an outline of how  could be well-ordered using only the definition given above.

Henceforth, we suppose that .

If one discounts (for the moment) the parameters, the formulas can be given a standard Gödel numbering by the natural numbers. Henceforth, we suppose that .

This is called the reverse lexicographic ordering; if there are multiple sequences of parameters that define one of the sets, we choose the least one under this ordering.

The well-ordering of the values of single parameters is provided by the inductive hypothesis of the transfinite induction. The values of -tuples of parameters are well-ordered by the product ordering. The formulas with parameters are well-ordered by the ordered sum (by Gödel numbers) of well-orderings.

It is well known that the axiom of choice is equivalent to the ability to well-order every set. Being able to well-order the proper class  (as we have done here with ) is equivalent to the axiom of global choice, which is more powerful than the ordinary axiom of choice because it also covers proper classes of non-empty sets.

has a reflection principle
Here we describe such a principle.

The generalized continuum hypothesis holds in  
And  because  and  have the same theory.

Thus this "power set" . And this in turn means that the "power set" of  has cardinal at most ||||. Assuming  itself has cardinal , the "power set" must then have cardinal exactly .

Constructible sets are definable from the ordinals 
There is a formula of set theory that expresses the idea that  = . Using this we can expand the definition of each constructible set. Notice that each  ∈  for some  < .

Example: The set {5,} is constructible. It is the unique set  that satisfies the formula:

where  is short for:

Actually, even this complex formula has been simplified from what the instructions given in the first paragraph would yield. But the point remains, there is a formula of set theory that is true only for the desired constructible set  and that contains parameters only for ordinals.

Relative constructibility
Sometimes it is desirable to find a model of set theory that is narrow like , but that includes or is influenced by a set that is not constructible.

The class for a non-constructible set  is the intersection of all classes that are standard models of set theory and contain  and all the ordinals.

() is defined by transfinite recursion as follows:
() = the smallest transitive set containing  as an element, i.e. the transitive closure of {  }.
() = Def (())
If  is a limit ordinal, then .
.

The definition of this class uses Def, which is the same as Def except instead of evaluating the truth of formulas  in the model (∈), one uses the model (∈,) where  is a unary predicate. Then the definition of [] is exactly that of  only with Def replaced by Def.

[] is always a model of the axiom of choice. Even if  is a set,  is not necessarily itself a member of [], although it always is if  is a set of ordinals.

See also 
 Axiom of constructibility
 Statements true in L
 Reflection principle
 Axiomatic set theory
 Transitive set
 L(R)
 Ordinal definable

Notes

References 
 
 

 
Works by Kurt Gödel